UNII may refer to:

 Unlicensed National Information Infrastructure (U-NII)
 Unique Ingredient Identifier